The West Marmara Region ( (TR2) is a statistical region in Turkey.

Subregions and provinces 
 Tekirdağ Subregion (TR21)
 Tekirdağ Province (TR211)
 Edirne Province (TR212)
 Kırklareli Province (TR213)
 Balıkesir Subregion (TR22)
 Balıkesir Province (TR221)
 Çanakkale Province (TR222)

Age groups

Internal immigration

State register location of West Marmara residents

Marital status of 15+ population by gender

Education status of 15+ population by gender

See also 
 NUTS of Turkey

References

External links 
 TURKSTAT

Sources 
 ESPON Database

Statistical regions of Turkey